The Free Association, or The FA, is a London-based improvised comedy theatre and school. It was founded in 2015 and operates two comedy venues and training centres in London. They are currently the largest provider of improvisation training in the UK.

The FA teach, produce and host live improvisational comedy from "The Free Association Theatre" in East London, on the border of Haggerston and Islington, and "The FA's Comedy Room" in Camden in North London.

In October 2018, The Free Association announced a partnership with Boom Chicago, a creative group, based in Amsterdam, The Netherlands, that writes and performs sketch and improvisational comedy at the Rozentheater. The partnership brings together Boom’s 25 years of improv history and the FA’s six-level curriculum with the aim to become Amsterdam’s premier location for improvisation training.

Philosophy 
As the UK's equivalent to American improv theatres UCB, IO and The Second City, the FA has brought the American-style of improvised comedy to the United Kingdom and adapted it for a British audience.

Playing with a flexible style between the "hard premise" of New York's UCB and the "organic" improv of Chicago's IO. The FA's main focus is the "game of the scene" and the "straight-man" - using these to create grounded comedic scenes.

FA house teams 
The following are teams that play regularly at The Free Association, either at weekends or on the weekly Harold Night show. They comprise graduates of The Free Association training programme.

Other shows 

The theatre also hosts ensemble shows performed by players from the House Teams. These include Jacuzii, The Ladies of FA County and Uncle Glen's Menagerie. Guest residencies from other London-based acts such as Do Not Adjust Your Stage, The Petting Zoo and Sorry take place monthly. Jacuzii has played at The Pleasance at the Edinburgh Festival Fringe from 2015 to 2018.

The Free Association performed a live version of Drunk History (UK TV series) at Comedy Central LIVE, a three-day stand-up festival at Southampton’s Hoglands Park on 5, 6 and 7 October 2018, with special guests including, Joel Dommett (Skins, Live in Chelsea, Impractical Jokers UK,  I'm a Celebrity...Get Me Out of Here!), Nish Kumar (The Mash Report, Newsjack) and Iain Stirling (CBBC, narrator ITV2 reality series Love Island).

Guest monologists 

The Free Association's headline Saturday Night show Jacuzii, and other 'special guest' nights welcome a guest monologist (frequently a celebrity) who uses a suggestion from the audience to inspire a truthful, personal monologue. The improvisers then use the monologue as inspiration for a series of scenes, which in turn inspire a response from the monologist.

The Free Association has performed with the following guest monologists and performers: Ralf Little, Nish Kumar, Oliver Chris, Tom Rosenthal, Phil Wang, Rachel Parris, Cariad Lloyd, Mae Martin, Steen Raskopoulos, Brett Goldstein, Rose Matafeo, Sindhu Vee, Matt Jones, Kirby Howell-Baptiste, Neil Casey and Jason Mantzoukas.

Training programme 

The FA training programme takes place over 6 levels and focuses on learning "The Harold", a form created by Del Close. The training is attended by performers, comedians, and individuals looking for extra confidence and a community.

The Free Association provides improvisation training for businesses, focusing on communication and collaboration through "FA at Work".

Additional work 
The Free Association's Michael Orton-Toliver and Chris Gau created the part-improvised "retro-scripted" comedy mockumentary Borderline for Channel 5 in 2016. The show features a number of Free Association-trained performers and was produced by The Royle Family's Ralf Little and directed by Breaking Bad's Matt Jones. Performers Ian Thomas Day, Chris Gau and Shaun Lowthian created the improvised character comedy podcast Fact Up in 2015. Now running to over 150 episodes, the podcast featured on BBC Radio 4 Extra's Podcast Radio Hour in 2018, recommended by comedian Cariad Lloyd.

Kayleigh Llewellyn created In My Skin, winning Best Television Drama at the 2019 BAFTA Cymru Awards. She was also named as one of BAFTA's Breakthrough Brits in 2019.

Performer Ambika Mod appeared in a leading role in HBO and BBC TV series This Is Going To Hurt in 2022.

References 

Improvisational theatre